José Arturo Salinas Garza (born 11 April 1975) is a Mexican politician affiliated with the PAN. As of 2013 he served as Deputy of the LXII Legislature of the Mexican Congress representing Nuevo León.

References

1975 births
Living people
People from Guadalupe, Nuevo León
National Action Party (Mexico) politicians
21st-century Mexican politicians
Deputies of the LXII Legislature of Mexico
Members of the Chamber of Deputies (Mexico) for Nuevo León